Lasita is an unincorporated community in Riley County, Kansas, United States.

History
A post office was opened in Lasita in 1892, and remained in operation until it was discontinued in 1935.

Education
The community is served by Riley County USD 378 public school district.

References

Further reading

External links
 Riley County maps: Current, Historic, KDOT

Unincorporated communities in Riley County, Kansas
Unincorporated communities in Kansas